The 1987–88 Soviet Championship League season was the 42nd season of the Soviet Championship League, the top level of ice hockey in the Soviet Union. Fourteen teams participated in the league, and CSKA Moscow won the championship.

First round

Final round

Playoffs

Relegation

External links
Season on hockeystars.ru

1
Soviet League seasons
Soviet sport